Herbert Brown (March 6, 1848 – May 12, 1913) was an American ornithologist and journalist who lived and worked in Arizona. He founded the Audubon Society of Arizona along with Harriet Blake and his collections of natural history specimens are now a part of the University of Arizona.

Biography
Herbert Brown was born in Winchester, Virginia, and moved to work in Tucson in 1873. He worked in various industries including timber, mining and trade before becoming a reporter for the Arizona Daily Star in the 1870s. He then became an administrator of the Territorial Land Office but a change in the administration led to his resignation in 1886 to join the Tucson Citizen, a newspaper that he acquired later. After meeting Edward William Nelson in 1883 he took an interest in natural history and began to collect specimens of the local fauna and flora. Among his collections included specimens of birds including those that were used by William Brewster to describe a new subspecies of the bobwhite quail Colinus virginianus ridgwayi. Brown also wrote in Forest and Stream, and Ornithology and Oology. Brown was the first curator of the Arizona Territorial Museum founded in 1893 which later became the Arizona State Museum. He resigned in 1912 and was followed by the temporary caretaker John James Thornber (1872-1962) (husband of Harriet Blake).

Brown died of a stomach cancer on May 12, 1913, and was buried at the Holy Hope cemetery in Tucson. Brown's collection of bird specimens is now in the University of Arizona.

Herbert Brown is commemorated in the scientific name of a species of North American snake, Phyllorhynchus browni.

References

American ornithologists
1848 births
1913 deaths
People from Winchester, Virginia